Exhausting Fire is the seventh full-length studio album by American sludge metal band Kylesa. It is the group's fourth album to be released through Season of Mist.

Reception 
The aggregate review site Metacritic assigned an average score of 82 out of 100 to the album based on 6 reviews, indicating "universal acclaim".

Track listing

Personnel 
Exhausting Fire album personnel adapted from the CD liner notes.

Kylesa
Laura Pleasants – vocals, guitar
Philip Cope – vocals, guitar, bass, keyboards
Carl McGinley – drums
Guest musicians
Jay Matheson – bass on "Moving Day", "Night Drive", "Growing Roots", "Out of My Mind", Shaping the Southern Sky", "Blood Moon" and "Lost and Confused"
Andrew J. Ripley – oboe on "Blood Moon"
Production
Philip Cope – producer, head engineer
Zac Thomas – head engineer
Steve Slavish – assistant engineer
Jay Matheson – assistant engineer
Carl McGinley – assistant engineer
FatRat Da Czar – assistant engineer
Dave Harris – mastering at Studio B, Columbia, South Carolina
Album artwork
Shaun Beaudry – album art
Laura Pleasants – art direction and additional graphics
Edley O'Dowd – Kylesa "K" logo

Charts

References

External links 
 Official website
 Official Facebook page

2015 albums
Kylesa albums
Season of Mist albums